Joseph James Vaughan (1878 – 1938) was a British politician.

Early life and career
Born in East London, Vaughan began working at the age of eight, but remained at school part-time until he was thirteen.  He worked a wide variety of jobs before he was apprenticed to a former Chartist.  This encouraged him to become a radical and join the Liberal Party.  However, he soon grew disillusioned with the party, and instead joined the British Socialist Party (BSP).

Vaughan eventually settled into a career as an electrician, joined the Electrical Trades Union (ETU) and became president of Bethnal Green Trades Council.  The BSP affiliated to the Labour Party, and it was under this party label that Vaughan was elected to Bethnal Green Borough Council in 1914.  He was the only Labour member of the council until 1919, when the party won a large majority.  As the only councillor with experience, he was elected mayor each year from 1919 until 1921.  In 1920, he was a founder member of the Communist Party of Great Britain (CPGB), and the following year attended the Third World Congress of the Communist International.  However, he also remained a member of Labour, even serving on the executive of the London Labour Party.

Vaughan stood for Bethnal Green South West at the 1922 and 1923 general elections for the Labour Party, with the endorsement of the CPGB, narrowly missing election on both occasions.  However, the Labour Party nationally had decided to expel CPGB members from the party.  The Bethnal Green Labour Party refused to endorse this, and was instead disaffiliated by Labour - the first of several such disaffiliations around the country.  It became the "Left-Wing Committee", and the following year, Vaughan was a founder of the National Left-Wing Movement, which attempted to draw these disaffiliated groups together and promote a Labour-Communist alliance.

At the 1924 general election, Vaughan stood for the first time as a CPGB candidate without official Labour support, but he did not face a Labour opponent, and achieved his best result, only 212 votes behind the winner.  However, the council election was a different matter; Labour stood a candidate against him, and he narrowly lost his council seat to a Liberal Party candidate.  He focused on work for the CPGB over the next few years; when most of the leadership of the party was imprisoned before the UK general strike, he served as an acting member of its organisation bureau.  That year, he stood for the general secretaryship of the ETU, but lost to Jimmy Rowan by 4067 votes to 730.

In a surprise change of tactic, the CPGB stood Vaughan in Manchester Platting at the 1929 general election, where he took only 1.0% of the vote.  He stood once more in Bethnal Green South West in 1931, falling to third with 17.4% of the votes cast.

Vaughan thereafter focused on activism in the ETU.  However, he was unable to find work in the industry and spent long periods unemployed.  In 1938, his union membership was removed on the grounds that he had not worked in the industry for twelve years.  He died the same year.

References

1878 births
1938 deaths
British Socialist Party members
Communist Party of Great Britain councillors
Members of Bethnal Green Metropolitan Borough Council
Mayors of places in Greater London
Labour Party (UK) councillors
Labour Party (UK) parliamentary candidates
Liberal Party (UK) politicians